Jeffrey James Cook (born October 21, 1956) is a retired American professional basketball player.

A 6'10" center from Idaho State University, Cook played in the National Basketball Association from 1979 to 1988 as a member of the Phoenix Suns, Cleveland Cavaliers, San Antonio Spurs, and Utah Jazz. He averaged 5.3 points and 4.5 rebounds in his NBA career.

Notes

1956 births
Living people
American expatriate basketball people in France
American expatriate basketball people in Italy
American men's basketball players
AS Monaco Basket players
Basketball players from California
Centers (basketball)
Cleveland Cavaliers players
Idaho State Bengals men's basketball players
Kansas City Kings draft picks
Libertas Liburnia Basket Livorno players
Panathinaikos B.C. players
Pensacola Tornados (1986–1991) players
Phoenix Suns players
San Antonio Spurs players
Sportspeople from West Covina, California
Utah Jazz players
Western Basketball Association players